Viktor Ahven (27 February 1929 – 13 March 2013) was a Finnish wrestler. He competed in the 1960 Summer Olympics.

References

External links

1929 births
2013 deaths
Wrestlers at the 1960 Summer Olympics
Finnish male sport wrestlers
Olympic wrestlers of Finland